The Beigang River, formerly known as the Pakan from its Hokkien pronunciation, is a river in Taiwan named for Beigang, a port 20 kilometres from its mouth. It flows through Yunlin and Chiayi counties for 82 km.

At the river mouth, lies the Aogu Wetland at Dongshi Township of Chiayi County.

Beigang River is moderately polluted.

Bridges
 Beigang Tourist Bridge

See also
List of rivers in Taiwan

References

Citations

Bibliography

 .

Landforms of Chiayi County
Landforms of Yunlin County
Rivers of Taiwan